Bera may refer to:

Acronyms
 Bioelectric recognition assay, a method in electrophysiology
 Botswana Energy Regulatory Authority, an energy regulatory body in Botswana
 Brainstem evoked response audiometry, a screening test to monitor for hearing loss or deafness
 Branford Electric Railway Association, a non-profit historical and educational institution in East Haven, Connecticut
 British Educational Research Association, a British education research organisation

People

Historical
 Bera (king), king of Sodom in Genesis 14
 Bera, Count of Barcelona (died 844), the first count of Barcelona

Given name
 Bera Brinck Løvstad (1915–1999), Norwegian long track speed skater
 Bera Ivanishvili (born 1994), Georgian musician and entrepreneur

Surname
 A. K. Bera, Indian banker
 Ami Bera (born 1965), American physician and politician
 Anil K. Bera (born 1955), Indian econometrician
 Fran Bera (1924–2018), American aviatrix and pilot
 Mulu Ayar Bera, Indian politician
 Nathalie Béra-Tagrine (born 1960), French classical pianist of Russian descent
 Richard Sam Bera (born 1971), Indonesian swimmer
 Victoire Léodile Béra (1824–1900), French novelist, journalist and feminist
 Willie Bera (born 1964), Papua New Guinean footballer

Places
 Bera (biblical place), mentioned in the Book of Judges in the Hebrew Bible
 Bera, Iran, a village in Kohgiluyeh and Boyer-Ahmad Province, Iran
 Bera, Mathura, a village in Naujhil Block, Mant Tahsil of Mathura district at Uttar Pradesh in India
 Bera, Navarre, a town and municipality in Navarre, northern Spain
 Bera Bach, an 807-metre mountain in north Wales
 Bera District, a district and town in Pahang, Malaysia
Bera (federal constituency), in Bera District, Pahang, Malaysia
 Bera Lake, natural freshwater lake system, located in Bera District, Pahang, Malaysia
 Bera Mawr, a 794-metre mountain in north Wales
 Bera Upazila, in Pabna District, Rajshahi Division, Bangladesh
 Arc de Berà (sometimes written Barà), a triumphal arch north-east of the city of Tarragona, Catalonia, Spain
 Tower of Bera, remains of a medieval watchtower located in the civil parish of Almalaguês, in the municipality of Coimbra, Portuguese Coimbra

Sports
 Bera Bera RT, Spanish rugby union club
 BM Bera Bera, Spanish women's handball club from San Sebastián

Other
 Bera (font), a family of typefaces
 Bera Holding, a Turkish group of companies

See also 
 Berra (disambiguation)